This Can't Happen Here (also released as High Tension in English) is a 1950 Swedish film directed by Ingmar Bergman and produced by Helge Hagerman.

Cast
 Signe Hasso as Vera
 Alf Kjellin as Almkvist
 Ulf Palme as Atkä Natas
 Gösta Cederlund as The Doctor
 Yngve Nordwall as Lindell
 Hanno Kompus as The Priest
 Sylvia Täl as Vanja
 Els Vårman as Refugee
 Edmar Kuus as Leino
 Helena Kuus as Woman at wedding
 Rudolf Lipp as Skuggan
 Sven-Axel Carlsson as Young Man

Reception
This Can't Happen Here is, along with The Touch, one of the Bergman films Bergman himself personally disliked the most.

References

External links

1950 films
1950 drama films
Swedish black-and-white films
Films directed by Ingmar Bergman
Swedish drama films
1950s Swedish-language films
Films scored by Erik Nordgren
1950s Swedish films